Meenakshi Gigi Durham is an Indian professor of communication studies and writer. Durham was born in Mangalore, India but moved to the United States and then Canada at a young age. She is a full professor at the University of Iowa, with a joint appointment in the journalism and mass communication departments. She was previously a Faculty Fellow in the Office of the Vice President for Research & Economic Development. She was also the Associate Faculty, Director of the Obermann Center of Advanced Studies, and she is a member of the board of directors for the Project of Rhetoric of Inquiry.

Durham sits on the editorial boards of the Journal of Communication, Feminist Media Studies, Critical Studies in Media Communication, Communication, Culture & Critique and Sexualization, Media, and Society. From 2007-2016, she was executive editor of the Journal of Communication Inquiry.

Selected publications

References

External links

Profile of Meenakshi Gigi Durham.
School of Journalism and Mass Communication, University of Iowa.

American feminist writers
American women writers
Feminist studies scholars
Living people
Mass media scholars
Media studies writers
Place of birth missing (living people)
Popular culture studies
University of Florida alumni
University of Iowa faculty
Year of birth missing (living people)